The High Sheriff of Dorset is an ancient high sheriff title which has been in existence for over one thousand years. Until 1567 the Sheriff of Somerset was also the Sheriff of Dorset.

On 1 April 1974, under the provisions of the Local Government Act 1972, the title of Sheriff of Dorset was retitled High Sheriff of Dorset.

The position was once a powerful position responsible for collecting taxes and enforcing law and order in Dorset. In modern times the high sheriff has become a ceremonial role, presiding over public ceremonies.

List of Sheriffs of Dorset

1066–1700

1701–1800

1801–1900

1901–1973

List of High Sheriffs of Dorset

1974–2000

2001–present

References
   The history of the worthies of England, Volume 1  By Thomas Fuller

 
Dorset
History of Dorset
Local government in Dorset
High Sheriff